In Greek mythology, the name Chromis (Ancient Greek: Χρόμις) may refer to:

Chromis (Chromius), a Mysian ally of Priam in the Trojan War, son of Arsinoos and brother of Ennomus.
Chromis, a man at the court of Phineus, was involved in the battle between Perseus and Phineus and killed Emathion.
Chromis, a companion of Aeneas killed by Camilla.
Chromis, a son of Heracles.
Chromis, name shared by four defenders of Thebes in the war of the Seven against Thebes:
Chromis, son of a Phoenician woman named Dryope and a descendant of Cadmus. His mother became a Maenad when she was pregnant with him, and gave birth to him while dragging a sacred bull by the horns. He was one of the fifty warriors that laid an ambush against Tydeus but were killed by him.
Chromis, killed by Amphiaraus.
Chromis, killed by Tydeus.
Chromis, who slew Ion and was himself killed by Antiphōs.

Notes

References 

 Apollodorus, The Library with an English Translation by Sir James George Frazer, F.B.A., F.R.S. in 2 Volumes, Cambridge, MA, Harvard University Press; London, William Heinemann Ltd. 1921. ISBN 0-674-99135-4. Online version at the Perseus Digital Library. Greek text available from the same website.
 Homer, The Iliad with an English Translation by A.T. Murray, Ph.D. in two volumes. Cambridge, MA., Harvard University Press; London, William Heinemann, Ltd. 1924. . Online version at the Perseus Digital Library.
 Homer, Homeri Opera in five volumes. Oxford, Oxford University Press. 1920. . Greek text available at the Perseus Digital Library.
 Publius Ovidius Naso, Metamorphoses translated by Brookes More (1859-1942). Boston, Cornhill Publishing Co. 1922. Online version at the Perseus Digital Library.
 Publius Ovidius Naso, Metamorphoses. Hugo Magnus. Gotha (Germany). Friedr. Andr. Perthes. 1892. Latin text available at the Perseus Digital Library.
 Publius Papinius Statius, The Thebaid translated by John Henry Mozley. Loeb Classical Library Volumes. Cambridge, MA, Harvard University Press; London, William Heinemann Ltd. 1928. Online version at the Topos Text Project.
 Publius Papinius Statius, The Thebaid. Vol I-II. John Henry Mozley. London: William Heinemann; New York: G.P. Putnam's Sons. 1928. Latin text available at the Perseus Digital Library.
 Publius Vergilius Maro, Aeneid. Theodore C. Williams. trans. Boston. Houghton Mifflin Co. 1910. Online version at the Perseus Digital Library.
 Publius Vergilius Maro, Bucolics, Aeneid, and Georgics. J. B. Greenough. Boston. Ginn & Co. 1900. Latin text available at the Perseus Digital Library.

People of the Trojan War
Children of Heracles
Heracleidae
Characters in Seven against Thebes
Theban characters in Greek mythology